Tim Sloth Jørgensen (born 21 October 1951) is a senior officer in the Royal Danish Navy and former Chief of Defence of the Danish Armed Forces.

Jørgensen resigned as chief of staff on 4 October 2009 due to his involvement in a controversial fake Arabic translation of Jæger – i krig med eliten, a book by a former special forces member the Danish Army Command tried to suppress.

In 2012, he became an advisor to Terma A/S, a Danish defense and aerospace manufacturer.

Awards and decorations 
  Commander 1st Class of the Order of the Dannebrog
  Queen Ingrid Commemorative Medal
  The Nordic Blue Berets Medal of Honour
  Navy Long Service Medal
  NATO medal for the former Yugoslavia

References 

1951 births
20th-century Danish military personnel
21st-century Danish military personnel
Chiefs of the Royal Danish Navy
Commanders First Class of the Order of the Dannebrog
Danish admirals
Living people
People from Randers